is a track cyclist from Japan. She represented her nation at the 2014 and 2015 UCI Track Cycling World Championships. She is also a professional keirin cyclist.

Career results

2014
3rd  Team Sprint, Asian Track Championships (with Kayono Maeda)
Japan Track Cup 1
3rd Keirin
3rd Sprint
2015
2nd  Team Sprint, Asian Track Championships (with Kayono Maeda)
3rd Sprint, Japan Track Cup
2016
Track Clubs ACC Cup
1st 500m Time Trial
1st Sprint
1st Team Sprint (With Yumi Kajihara)
1st Keirin, Japan Track Cup
Taiwan Hsin-Chu Track International Classic
1st Keirin
1st Sprint
1st Keirin
3rd Sprint
3rd Team Sprint (with Kayono Maeda)
3rd  Team Sprint, Asian Track Championships (with Kayono Maeda)
2017
3rd Sprint, National Track Championships

References

External links
 Profile at Cyclingarchives.com
 Keirin Station profile 

1990 births
Japanese female cyclists
Living people
Cyclists at the 2014 Asian Games
Keirin cyclists
Asian Games competitors for Japan
20th-century Japanese women
21st-century Japanese women